Patrick Pircher (born 7 April 1982, in Bregenz) is an Austrian footballer playing for FC Dornbirn.

National team statistics

Honours
 Austrian Football Bundesliga winner: 2002–03
 Austrian Cup winner: 2002–03

References

External links
 

1982 births
Living people
Austrian footballers
Austria international footballers
Austria under-21 international footballers
SW Bregenz players
FK Austria Wien players
FC Admira Wacker Mödling players
SC Rheindorf Altach players
FC Augsburg players
FC Juniors OÖ players
Austrian Football Bundesliga players
2. Bundesliga players
Austrian expatriate footballers
Expatriate footballers in Germany
Association football defenders
People from Bregenz
Footballers from Vorarlberg